Anna "Kakurukaze" Mungunda (1932–10 December 1959) was a Namibian woman of Herero descent. She was the only woman among the casualties of the Old Location uprising in Windhoek on 10 December 1959. Since Namibia's independence on 21 March 1990, Mungunda is regarded one of the heroes of the Namibian nation.

Mungunda was born in 1932 to migrant labourer Theopoldt Shivute and Emilia Kavezeri, a niece of Hosea Kutako. She had three siblings who all died in their infancy.

Sources disagree on what exactly happened to Mungunda, who was employed as a domestic worker, on the day of the Old Location uprising. It is reported that the fatal shooting of her only son, Kaaronda Mungunda, enraged her so much that she ran towards the car of a high-ranking administrator, poured petrol over it, and set it alight. The car either belonged to mayor Jaap Snyman or to Old Location Police Superintendent de Wet. Both cars were set alight during the demonstration. She was shot dead during or immediately after this action.

Anna Mungunda is one of nine national heroes of Namibia that were identified at the inauguration of the country's Heroes' Acre near Windhoek. Founding president Sam Nujoma remarked in his inauguration speech on 26 August 2002 that:
On that fateful day [of the Old Location uprising], twelve peaceful demonstrators were killed and more than fifty others were injured. In the face of this brutality, a courageous and fearless young woman by the name of Kakurukaze Mungunda demonstrated her bravery and heroism by setting alight the car of De Wet who was the superintendent of the Windhoek Old Location. She was shot on the spot and Killed in cold blood by the South African apartheid repressive police. To her revolutionary spirit and his visionary memory we humbly offer our honour and respect.
Mungunda is honoured in form of a granite tombstone with her name engraved and her portrait plastered onto the slab. The city of Berlin announced that the street "Petersallee", in the Afrikanisches Viertel, would be renamed "Anna-Mungunda-Allee".

References

1932 births
1959 deaths
Herero people
South West African anti-apartheid activists
National heroes of Namibia
Deaths by firearm in Namibia
Namibian domestic workers
20th-century Namibian people
20th-century Namibian women
Namibian women